Orthonevra chilensis is a species of hoverfly first found in Chile.

Description
Its head is metallic steel blue; the face straight except the ventral fifth produced anteriorly, strongly rugose and shiny; the macula is widely separated from the antennal base; the gena is shiny and rugose; the frontal triangle is shiny; frontal lunule smooth; vertical triangle black. Dichoptic, eyes separated by approximately the width of the anterior ocellus; the occiput is white; the eye brown, with a distinct medial dark vitta.

The antenna is orange, except for the basofiagellomere, which is more brownish on its apical 2/3 and is elongate.

The thorax is a metallic steel blue colour: its pile short and appressed, white on steel blue areas, black on

darker areas; mesonotum has darker blackish blue submedial and sublateral vittae; squama and plumula are white; halter orange.

The legs are a metallic bluish black except the tibiae and basotarsomere, which is brownish orange.

The wings are brownish, densely microtrichose.

The abdomen is metallic steel blue; dorsum extensively dull black, shiny on lateral fourth of 1st tergum, in form of basolateral maculae on the basal half of 2nd and 3rd terga, and lateral third of the 4th tergum; sterna are shiny.

References

External links

ADW entry

Eristalinae
Diptera of South America
Insects described in 1999
Endemic fauna of Chile
Taxa named by F. Christian Thompson